Shaker Creek is a stream in the U.S. state of Kentucky. It is a tributary to the Kentucky River.

Shaker Creek was named after the Shakers who settled near it. A variant name is "Shaker Fork".

References

Rivers of Mercer County, Kentucky
Rivers of Kentucky